The commune of Gihogazi is a rural commune of Karuzi Province in central Burundi. The capital is Gihogazi. According to the 2008 census, Gihogazi had a total population of 67,627, of which 48% was male, and a population density of 351 people per km.

It consists of the following 21 collines:

 Bihembe
 Bikingi
 Gasenyi
 Gasivya
 Gihogazi
 Kibezi
 Kivoga
 Kizingoma
 Mugero
 Mugogo
 Munanira
 Murago
 Mushikanwa
 Muzenga
 Nyamiyaga
 Ramba
 Ruganira
 Rusamaza
 Rutegama
 Ruyaga
 Taba

References

Communes of Burundi
Karuzi Province